The 2002–03 Liga Artzit season saw Hakoah Ramat Gan win the title and promotion to Liga Leumit alongside runners-up Ironi Kiryat Shmona. Hapoel Kafr Sumei and Hapoel Bat Yam were relegated to Liga Alef.

Final table

References
Israel Third Level 2002/03 RSSSF

Liga Artzit seasons
3
Israel